Boden may refer to:

Places
Boden Block, in Nuapada District, Odisha, India
Boden Municipality, in Sweden
Boden, Sweden, a city and the seat of Boden Municipality
Boden, Germany, a municipality in the district Westerwaldkreis, in Rhineland-Palatinate, Germany
Boden, Illinois, an unincorporated community
Boden, Ohio, an unincorporated community

Other uses
Boden (surname)
Boden (clothing), a clothing retailer
Boden Scholarship, established in 1833 at the University of Oxford for students learning Sanskrit
Norrland Engineer Battalion (Boden Engineer Regiment), a Swedish Army unit from 1905 to 2005

See also
Boden's Mate, a mating pattern in chess, discovered by Samuel Boden